Lightning Brigade can refer to:

 Lightning Brigade (US Army of the Cumberland 1863), a brigade in the 19-century Union Army
 Paratroopers Brigade "Folgore", a unit of the Italian army
 Danab Brigade, a unit of the Somali Armed Forces